A prehormone is a biochemical substance secreted by glandular tissue and has minimal or no significant biological activity, but it is converted in peripheral tissues into an active hormone. Calcifediol is an example of a prehormone which is produced by hydroxylation of vitamin D3 (cholecalciferol) in the liver. Another example is adrenal androgens like dehydroepiandrosterone and androstenedione, which can be converted into testosterone and dihydrotestosterone.

See also
 Prohormone

References 

Hormones